"Major Distribution" is a song by American hip hop recording artist 50 Cent. It was originally released as a single in promotion for his abandoned sixth studio album Street King Immortal. The song premiered on December 20, 2012, on New York City radio station Hot 97 with DJ Enuff. The song, produced by Soul Professa, features fellow American rappers Snoop Dogg and Young Jeezy. It was made available for purchase on February 5, 2013.

Background 
The song's release on the iTunes Store was announced with the official music video, after being released in December. Young Jeezy's verse, recorded in the second half of 2012, was confirmed by 50 Cent in an interview with DJ Whoo Kid, in July.

Music video 
A music video for was filmed throughout December and January, being directed by Eif Rivera. It includes cameo appearances from 50 Cent's fellow G-Unit members, including Tony Yayo and Kidd Kidd. Also, the affiliates of Snoop Dogg and Young Jeezy appear in the video, such as Kurupt, Daz Dillinger and members of CTE World, respectively. A teaser video was released before the song's release on December 20, via 50 Cent's YouTube channel. The music video came out on January 23, 2013, on VEVO channel of 50 Cent. On January 28, 2013, it was made available for purchase on iTunes Store.

The music video and song has been viewed over 20 million times on YouTube.

Controversy 
In the video, G-Unit flaunts Gunplay's MMG chain that was taken from him at a brawl backstage at the 2012 BET Hip Hop Awards. G-Unit's Kidd Kidd has the chain draped around his sons neck in the video.

Track listing 
Digital download
"Major Distribution"  - 4:23

Credits and personnel 
Songwriter – Curtis Jackson, Calvin Broadus, Jay Jenkins, Marvin Coady, W. Godfrey & Chuck Jackson
Production – Soul Professa

Charts

Release history

References

External links
 

2013 singles
2013 songs
50 Cent songs
Snoop Dogg songs
Jeezy songs
Songs written by 50 Cent
Songs written by Snoop Dogg
Songs written by Jeezy
Shady Records singles
Aftermath Entertainment singles
Interscope Records singles